Ptinini is a tribe of spider beetles in the family Ptinidae. There are about 18 genera and at least 120 described species in Ptinini.

Genera
These genera belong to the tribe Ptinini:

 Casapus Wollaston, 1862 g
 Cyphoniptus Bellés, 1992
 Dignomus Wollaston, 1862 g
 Epauloecus Mulsant & Rey, 1868 b
 Eurostodes Reitter, 1884 g
 Eurostoptinus Pic, 1895
 Eutaphrimorphus Pic, 1898
 Hanumanus Bellés, 1991
 Kedirinus Bellés, 1991 g
 Lapidoniptus Belles, 1981 g
 Myrmecoptinus Wasmann, 1916 g
 Niptodes Reitter, 1884 g
 Niptus Boieldieu, 1856 i c g b
 Oviedinus Bellés, 2010 g
 Piarus Wollaston, 1862 g
 Pseudeurostus Heyden, 1906 i c g b
 Ptinus Linnaeus, 1766 i c g b
 Scaleptinus Borowski, 2006

Data sources: i = ITIS, c = Catalogue of Life, g = GBIF, b = Bugguide.net

References

Further reading

External links

 

Ptinidae